is a German television series produced by Monaco Film Hamburg, subsidiary of Odeon Film.

List of episodes

External links
 
  at ZDF television network 

German crime television series
2010s German television series
2006 German television series debuts
2020 German television series endings
German-language television shows
ZDF original programming
2000s German police procedural television series
2010s German police procedural television series
2020s German police procedural television series